Scopula episcia is a moth of the family Geometridae. It was described by Edward Meyrick in 1888. It is endemic to Australia.

References

Moths described in 1888
Moths of Australia
episcia
Taxa named by Edward Meyrick